Mazal ibn  Jabir (18?? – 1897, styled Muaz us-Sultana) was the son of Haji Jabir Khan Ibn Merdaw and succeeded him as tribal leader of the Bani Kaab and Sheikh of Mohammerah upon his father's death. This was confirmed by an Imperial Qajar farman (executive order). Some accounts state that he was assassinated by his younger brother, Khazal Khan, while others state that he was slain by a palace guard under orders from Khazal.

1897 deaths
Year of birth unknown
19th-century Arabs